Seroiro is one of eleven parishes (administrative divisions) in the municipality of Ibias, within the province and autonomous community of Asturias, in northern Spain.

Villages and hamlets
 Andeo 
 Dou 
 Folgueiras de Aviouga 
 Morentan 
 Pradias 
 Seroiro 
 Uria 
 Valdebueyes
 Valvaler

References

Parishes in Ibias